Shamoon v Chief Constable of the Royal Ulster Constabulary [2003] UKHL 11 is a UK labour law case concerning the appropriate test for determining who is a comparator.

Facts
Ms Shamoon was a chief inspector. She did appraisals of the constables in the Urban Traffic Branch. Her appraisal duties were removed from her after complaints were made about the way she did them. She was dismissed and made a claim under the Sex Discrimination (Northern Ireland) Order 1976, which is the same as the SDA 1975, and now found in the Equality Act 2010.

The Employment Tribunal held that there was sex discrimination. It said that the appropriate comparators were two male chief inspectors who were in the same branch and had the same duties, in which they continued, but who had not had complaints against them. The Northern Ireland Court of Appeal held that her claim failed because the two comparators she pointed to who had done similar appraisals had had no complaints made against them.

Judgment
The House of Lords held that the comparators were inappropriate because there had been no complaints about them. Lord Hope agreed that the comparators were inappropriate. He noted that choosing which characteristics are relevant for the purposes of comparison should not defeat the purpose of the legislation, ‘which is to eliminate discrimination against women on the ground of their sex in all areas with which it deals.’

Lord Nicholls said that tribunals,

See also

UK labour law
UK employment equality law

Notes

References

United Kingdom labour case law
House of Lords cases
2003 in case law
2003 in British law
Royal Ulster Constabulary